Mad in America is a webzine dedicated to critical perspectives on modern psychiatry. It was founded in 2012 by Robert Whitaker, who also publishes the site. Whitaker founded the Mad in America website in response to the positive reactions to his books Mad in America and Anatomy of an Epidemic. Its mission statement originally stated,  The site has been described as "one important umbrella site for critical engagements with psychiatry" and an example of "active groups and actors with a history of providing robust commentary on the DSM" by Martyn Pickersgill in the Journal of Medical Ethics.

References

External links

Magazines established in 2012
Anti-psychiatry
Online magazines published in the United States
American medical websites
Health magazines
Works about psychology